Gowri Ganda (Kannada: ಗೌರಿ ಗಂಡ) is a 1968 Indian Kannada film, directed and produced by Sundara Rao Nadakarni. The film stars Narasimharaju, Mynavathi, Raja Shankar and B. Jaya in the lead roles. The film has musical score by Thare Ganesh.

Cast
Narasimharaju
Mynavathi
Raja Shankar
B. Jaya
Sarasa

References

External links
 

1968 films
1960s Kannada-language films